is a city located in Tochigi Prefecture, Japan. , the city had an estimated population of 80,239 in 36,531 households, and a population density of 55 persons per km2. It is a popular destination for Japanese and international tourists. Attractions include the mausoleum of shōgun Tokugawa Ieyasu (Nikkō Tōshō-gū) and that of his grandson Iemitsu (Iemitsu-byō Taiyū-in), and the Futarasan Shrine, which dates to the year 767 AD. There are also many famous hot springs (onsen) in the area. Elevations range from 200 to 2,000 meters. The Japanese saying 【日光を見ずして結構と言うなかれ】 "Never say 'kekkō' until you've seen Nikkō"—kekkō meaning beautiful, magnificent or "I am satisfied"—is a reflection of the beauty and sites in Nikkō.

Geography

Nikkō covers a vast area (1,449.83 km2) of rural northwestern Tochigi approximately 140 km north of Tokyo and 35 km west of Utsunomiya, the capital of Tochigi Prefecture. It is the third-largest city (by area) in Japan, behind Takayama and Hamamatsu.

Both the Watarase River and the Kinugawa River pass through the city. Lake Chūzenji and the Kegon Falls lie in Nikkō, as does the Nikko Botanical Garden. The city's many mountains and waterfalls have made it an important source of hydroelectric power. The area has also been used for mining copper, aluminum and concrete.

The weather in Nikkō is fairly similar to that of the northern island of Hokkaidō, even though Nikkō is much closer to Tokyo than Hokkaidō. The elevation of Nikkō plays an important role in this fact. It will usually get cooler as one ascends the mountain. The average temperature of Nikkō is around 7 °C (44 °F) with the warmest months reaching only about 22 °C (72 °F) and the coldest reaching down to about −8 °C (17 °F).

Surrounding municipalities 
Tochigi Prefecture
 Utsunomiya
 Kanuma
 Nasushiobara
 Shioya
Gunma Prefecture
Numata
Midori
Katashina
Fukushima Prefecture
Minamiaizu
Hinoemata

Climate
Nikkō has a Humid continental climate (Köppen Dfb) characterized by warm summers and cold winters with heavy snowfall.

Demographics
Per Japanese census data, the population of Nikkō has declined over the past 20 years.

History

The village of Nikkō developed around these temples. The shrine of Nikkō Tōshō-gū was completed in 1617 and became a major draw of visitors to the area during the Edo period. It is known as the burial place of the shōgun Tokugawa Ieyasu. A number of new roads were built during this time to provide easier access to Nikkō from surrounding regions. Nikkō Tōshō-gū, Futarasan Shrine, and Rinnō-ji now form the UNESCO World Heritage Site Shrines and Temples of Nikkō.

During the Meiji period, Nikkō developed as a mountain resort, and became particularly popular among foreign visitors to Japan. The Japanese National Railways began service to Nikkō in 1890 with the Nikkō Line, followed by Tobu Railway in 1929 with its Nikkō Line.

Nikkō was incorporated as a town in 1889 (part of Kamitsuga District) with the establishment of the modern municipalities system. It was upgraded to city status in 1954 after merging with the neighboring village of Okorogawa.

On March 20, 2006, Nikkō absorbed the neighboring city of Imaichi, the town of Ashio (from Kamitsuga District), the town of Fujihara, and the village of Kuriyama (both from Shioya District), to create what is officially the new and expanded city of Nikkō. The new city hall is located at the former Imaichi City Hall; the former Nikkō City Hall is now known as Nikkō City Hall-Nikkō Satellite Office.

Government
Nikkō has a mayor-council form of government with a directly elected mayor and a unicameral city legislature of 24 members. Nikkō contributes two members to the Tochigi Prefectural Assembly. In terms of national politics, the town is part of Tochigi 2nd district of the lower house of the Diet of Japan.

Economy
Nikkō is heavily dependent on tourism to its historical and scenic sites and hot spring resorts. Hydroelectric power production, food processing, and the non-ferrous metals industry are also important components of the economy.

Nikkō has been recognized by Japan's Office for the Promotion of Regional Revitalization (Kishida Cabinet Secretariat), which promotes the development of new technologies to combat depopulation, for its "high standard" of digital transformation/telework infrastructure. Related projects have been awarded over ¥19.1M in government grants.

Education
Nikko has 23 public primary schools, 12 public middle schools and three combined public primary/midde schools operated by the city government. The city has three public high schools operated by the Tochigi Prefectural Board of Education. The prefecture also operates one special education school for the handicapped.

High schools:

Transportation

Railway
 JR East –  Nikkō Line 
  -  -   -  
 Tōbu Railway – Tōbu Nikkō Line
  -  -  -  - 
 Tōbu Railway – Tōbu Kinugawa Line
  -  -  -  -  -  -  -  -  
Yagan Railway
  -  -  -  -  -  -  - 
Watarase Keikoku Railway
  -  -  -

Highway
  – Yaita IC, Yaita-Kita PA
  – Kiyotaki IC, Nikko IC, Imaichi IC, Dosawa IC, Osawa IC

Local attractions

 Cedar Avenue of Nikko
 Nikko Botanical Garden
 Tamozawa Imperial Villa
 Shrines and Temples of Nikkō (Nikkō Tōshō-gū, Futarasan Shrine, and Rinnō-ji)
 Nikkō Tōshō-gū
 The Three wise monkeys ("See no evil, hear no evil, speak no evil")
 Rinnō-ji
 Taiyū-in Mausoleum
 Shōyō-en Garden
 Futarasan Shrine
 Lake Chūzenji
 Edo Wonderland Nikko Edomura (historical theme park)
 Nikko is well known for its monkeys that walk around the town in the winter looking for food.
 Jizō Bosatsu statues on the Kanman Walk. A little out of the main city, locals often tell visitors to count the statues while walking, and to recount while walking back. The number is often different, fueling a legend amongst locals.
 Kanmangafuchi Abyss is a place that was formed from the lava from the eruption of Mt. Nantai

Sports 

Nikkō is the home city to the Nikkō Ice Bucks in the Asia League Ice Hockey. Nikkō Kirifuri Ice Arena hosted the Women's Ice Hockey World Championships (Division I) in April 2007.

There is also a speed skating oval.

Sister city relations 
  Rapid City, South Dakota, United States, sister city since February 7, 1993
  Tainan, Taiwan, friendship city since January 16, 2009
  Odawara, Kanagawa Prefecture, since December 19, 1980

Notable people
Masaru Ibuka, entrepreneur, co-founder of Sony
Shoma Sato, professional baseball player
Akio Fukuda, politician
Tomikazu Fukuda, politician

References

External links

 Official Website 
  
 Nikko Tourist Association 
 Nikko Kinugawa Travel Guide

 
Cities in Tochigi Prefecture